Joseph Nicholas Macaluso Sr. (born March 10, 1928) is an American musician, counselor, teacher, administrator, veteran of World War II and the Korean War, and retired colonel.  He is also an author, Italian-American Civic Award recipient, and civic leader.

Early life
Born March 10, 1928 in New Orleans, Louisiana (Algiers) into a family of immigrants from Contessa Entellina, (Nicholas J. Macaluso Sr.) and Giuliana,  Sicily (Frances Mary Calabrese) he was the second of three sons. 
Trumpet lessons commenced in the early 1930s after receiving his first trumpet, made by Regent, bought at Werlein's a fixture in New Orleans music at that time. With that trumpet came 8 free lessons at All State Band on St. Charles Avenue, a local music venue owned by noted cornetist Johnny Wiggs. 
Later, lessons were taken with a local black Creole trumpeter, Manuel Manetta. The charge was 50 cents per lesson and it is recalled that when the assignment was completed the lesson was over, no time limit. The family owned a grocery and seafood market, as was common for many Italian immigrant families of the time.

Education 

He attended local schools in (ALGIERS) New Orleans, including Martin Behrman School (Alice Harte, Principal) and Belleville Elementary (Edna Karr, Principal) in Algiers and later St. Aloysius High School in New Orleans (Bro. Martin, S. C. Principal), where he was a band member for four years under the direction of Professor Taverna, composer of the schools famous fight song. During this time he also studied private lessons with another New Orleans noted musician, Salvador, Castigliola. Subsequently, during his college years, he studied with another New Orleans great, George Jansen, who was widely regarded as one of, if not the, best music teachers in all of New Orleans. Jansen was also well known as one of the rare teacher in those days who would accept both white and black students without question. 
A graduate of Loyola University, New Orleans, in 1951 with a bachelor's degree in music, he later completed studies for a master's degree in counseling and guidance from Loyola University and received a Ph.D. in educational administration, supervision and management from the University of Southern Mississippi, Hattiesburg, Mississippi.

Music career 
Macaluso worked initially as a band director/music teacher at Warren Easton High School in New Orleans, and later at Destrehan High School in Destrehan, Louisiana. From 1955 to 1965 he was Band Director and Director of Music Education at Belle Chasse High School in Belle Chasse, Louisiana.  During this time his bands, both marching and concert received numerous awards, superior ratings and were considered among the finest marching bands in the South, repeatedly participating in the Greatest Bands in Dixie marching event held during the Krewe of Mid City Carnival Parade annually during Mardi Gras season. The band was also a regular participant in Band Day at LSU in Baton Rouge performing with other top marching bands from around the state at halftime of an LSU football game each season.  From 1965- 1977 Macaluso was a teacher, band director, counselor, administrative assistant, and assistant principal at EDNA KARR JR. HIGH SCHOOL in Algiers.

Professionally he played regularly at venues throughout the city. His associations included regular performances with the Leon Kelner's Blue Room Orchestra at the Roosevelt Hotel in New Orleans, with Herb Tassin and with Rene Louapre Society Orchestra. He served as a Herald for the King of Carnival, Rex, at the Rex Ball for over 30 years, participating in the famed "Meeting of the Courts" of Rex and the Mystic Krewe of Comus.

Military service 
US Coast Guard, WWII, San Pedro, California and New London, Connecticut; Yeoman 3rd Class

US Army, Korean War (Military Police), Panmunjom, Korea 38th parallel/ 1st Lieutenant

After service in the US Army, Military Police on active duty in Korea, he returned to become full-time band director (see Music Career). After leaving active duty he remained in the US Army Reserves. He completed some 33 years of military service (combined active duty and reserve duty). He rose the rank of full colonel and became commander, 1190th Deployment Support Brigade

Professor emeritus, Our Lady of Holy Cross College

LPC (Licensed Professional Counselor, Louisiana)

Licensed (Louisiana) LMFT (licensed marriage and family therapist)

Italian Immigrant Families: Grocers, Proprietors, And Entrepreneurs

Awards
Legion of Merit Award and Medal, US Army, 1981 by order of President Ronald Reagan 
Meritorious Service Medal, US Army, 1981 by order of President Ronald Reagan
Graduate, National Defense Strategy Seminar – National War College
Order of St. Louis Medal, Archdiocese of New Orleans, 1989

References

1928 births
Living people
American people of Italian descent
American male musicians
Musicians from New Orleans
Brother Martin High School alumni
People from Belle Chasse, Louisiana
United States Army colonels